Efecte is a Finnish software corporation that produces cloud-based solutions and related services to its customers. Its product range consists of IT departments’ ERP solutions, i.e. IT Service Management solutions, and Identity and Access Management software that is needed for signing into different IT systems.

The company was founded in 1998 and it was listed in Nasdaq First North Helsinki market place in 2017.

History

1998–2012
Jaan Apajalahti, Kristian Jaakkola, and Jussi Sarkkinen  founded the company in 1998  by the name Bitmount Systems Oy.

In 2002, the name of the company was changed to Efecte Oy. The company’s first international subsidiary was founded in 2005.
In 2006, Efecte’s revenue growth was more than 60%, and it employed 70 people in Nordic countries.

In 2007, Efecte’s revenue was 6,3 million euros, and growth year-over-year was more than 60%. The rapid growth compared to the industry overall was due to the growth of market share in Finland and successful business in other Nordic countries. New offices were opened in Denmark and Norway. In ten years, Efecte had become a leading company in its field in the Nordics.

In 2008, Efecte employed 100 people in the Nordics, 70 in Finland and the rest in Sweden, Norway, and Denmark. It sought for new growth in the German market. About half of the company’s customer base was in the public sector and about half in the private sector. E.g., 11 out of the 15 biggest cities and municipalities in Finland were Efecte’s customers. Corporate revenue was almost 8 million euros.

The years after the financial crisis were difficult for the company. In 2009, the number of employees was radically reduced, and Efecte’s founders left the company’s operative leadership positions. New professional leadership was appointed, whose focus was in the software business. Following the new channel partner strategy, Efecte gave up its own sales organization and consulting business.

2013–
When the company's finances had been fixed by 2013, Efecte renewed its strategy. The decision was made to start producing software as a service. That means that using the solutions did not require installations or own servers from the customers. Cloud-based solutions had been tested already since 2009. Sakari Suhonen, previously deputy-CEO of the company, was nominated to be the next CEO. Moving from license sales to recurring monthly billing was a big transformation in the business model, in sales, and in the company’s culture.

The company focused its efforts on product development and started to build a cloud platform that would not be dependent on multinational cloud platform vendors like Microsoft or Amazon. Early 2013, Efecte acquired RM5 Software, which had concentrated on identity and access management software. Efecte re-started its own sales organization and gave up partner channel sales. The company also resumed its consulting business.

In 2015, Efecte launched a new solution platform, Efecte Edge. The company had approximately 200 customers. The company also migrated its old customers towards using its cloud solutions.

In 2016, the company’s revenue reached 8,3 million euros.

By 2017, Efecte’s customer number had reached approximately 300, and it had 80 employees. The number of employees in Germany tripled when Efecte hired a six-person team from its American competitor Cherwell. Efecte rationalized the unconventional growth strategy with the team knowing the market well and being more ready as employees than people coming from outside the industry. In December, the company was listed on Nasdaq First North Helsinki market place. The company’s turnover passed 10 million euros for the first time.

In July 2018, Niilo Fredrikson was nominated CEO after Sakari Suhonen, who had held the position for five years. During Suhonen’s tenure, the company renewed its product portfolio, moved to cloud solutions, and became a listed entity. During the previous year, the company had also hired dozens of new employees. Fredrikson started in his CEO role in September. International business accounted for 20% of the company’s turnover.

In spring 2019, the SaaS business accounted for 50% of the company’s net revenue.

In May 2022, Efecte announced the acquisition of a Polish SaaS company. InteliWise had focused on automating conversations using artificial intelligence. The deal was finalized in July.

Organization
Efecte corporation’s parent company is Efecte Plc. Its headquarters is located in Espoo, Finland. In 2021 there were 114 employees in Efecte. The company serves its Scandinavian customers from Stockholm, Sweden, German, Swiss, and Austrian customers from Munich, Germany, and Spanish customers from Madrid, Spain. In Germany, Efecte collaborates with Bechtle GmbH IT System House Hamburg.

The company's CEO is Niilo Fredrikson.

Products
Efecte offers cloud-based IT Service Management and Identity and Access Management software and professional services that support them. With Efecte's platform, customers digitalize, manage and automate different services. Customers use the platform to manage, e.g., IT, HR and financial services, customer service, and access rights. The platform is also in use in facilities, contract management, and identity management.

Efecte's customer base consists of different service organizations in large and mid-sized companies and public sector entities. In Finland, e.g., Mehiläinen, Musti Group, and Sarastia were Efecte's customers in 2019. In Switzerland, one of Efecte's largest customers is the hotel chain Hotelplan Group that has over 1600 offices.

In 2019, 80% of the company's revenue came from service management, and the remaining 20% from Identity and Access Management. Service management includes planning, delivering, managing, and developing organizations' IT services. Identity and Access Management means the creation, management, and storing users' identities and access rights. Efecte's ticketing systems are used in IT functions, but increasingly also in finance departments. Efecte's platform has an integrated kanban board, on which tasks move as cards from left (To Do) to the right (Done), moving through different process phases. Efecte offers services that are related to its software products, e.g., implementation projects, integration work, training, and continuous development of customers' environments. In 2015 Nordic customers included SSAB, Roskilde Municipality, Danske Bank, and Stena Sphere. In 2015 the company said other customers were companies such as Konecranes, Patria, DNA Oy, VR Group, Paulig, and Finnish cities Helsinki, Vantaa, Espoo, and Tampere.

Recognitions
In the Technology Fast 50 ranking published by Deloitte & Touche, Efecte ranked among the fastest growing Finnish technology companies in 2005, 2006, 2007 and 2008, making the top 10 list in 2005. In 2005, Efecte was also ranked as the 216th fastest growing technology company across EMEA. 
In 2008, Efecte ranked 9th in Best Workplaces in Finland study conducted by Great Place to Work Institute. Efecte was also the only so-called gazelle company in an annual mapping of the Finnish software industry. According to the definition, a gazelle company grows at least 50% on three consequent years.
In 2020, Efecte was ranked Finland’s 10th best workplace in Great Place to Work Finland’s mid-sized company category.

References 

Software companies of Finland